Nikara Jenkins (born 1997) is a Welsh rhythmic gymnast who won a silver medal in the Women's rhythmic team all-around event at the 2014 Commonwealth Games in Glasgow.

Career
In May 2014, Jenkins reached the final of the British Rhythmic Championships. Aged 17, Jenkins qualified to compete at the 2014 Commonwealth Games in Glasgow. At the Games, Jenkins, Francesca Jones and Laura Halford won a silver medal in the Women's rhythmic team all-around event. It was Wales' first Commonwealth Games medal in a team event, and Wales' first medal at the 2014 Games.

References

External links

1997 births
Living people
Gymnasts at the 2014 Commonwealth Games
Sportspeople from Swansea
British rhythmic gymnasts
Welsh gymnasts
Commonwealth Games medallists in gymnastics
Commonwealth Games silver medallists for Wales
Medallists at the 2014 Commonwealth Games